The Boston School of Occupational Therapy is an American college offering degree programs in occupational therapy. It is part of the Tufts University School of Arts and Sciences. It was founded in 1918 at the request of the surgeon general of the United States Army, and became affiliated to Tufts University in 1945.

Rankings
The Boston School of Occupational Therapy (BSOT) was ranked #6 in 2016, according to the U.S. News & World Report Best Occupational Therapy Programs.

References

Occupational therapy organizations
Tufts University
1918 establishments in Massachusetts